Jakson Group was established in the year 1947 as an electrical trading firm, today it is a diversified energy and Infrastructure company having expertise in Distributed Energy, Solar Solutions and Electrical EPC Solutions. Jakson is head quartered at Noida, Uttar Pradesh, India and has four state of the art manufacturing facilities for manufacturing of Generating Sets, Solar Modules and Battery Energy Storage Systems. Jakson Group has more than 2500 persons working for the company and has a presence in India, SAARC, Middle East and African regions.

The Distributed Energy Business offers products and solutions in the areas of diesel generator sets and solar PV modules, Gas Generators, Solar Roof Top systems, Battery Energy Storage Systems, Special application generating sets for Defence sector, Hybrid solutions and Micro grids.. 
Jakson Solar Business consists of a fully automated Solar module manufacturing plant which will be able to manufacture high efficiency and high power density solar modules of 1 GW capacity. The company manufactures Module Mounting Structures and “ready to use” solar off-grid as well as on-grid kits and distribute these products through 500 plus channel partners and system integrator all over the Country and have now expanded to international geographies.

Jakson Electrical EPC Business has design and engineering capabilities for delivering projects related to sub-stations, transmission, distribution, rural electrification, railway and metro rail electrification, utility scale land based solar power plants and civil infrastructure projects.

The Engineering, Procurement and Construction (EPC) business provides turnkey services for utility scale & rooftop solar power plants, rural & urban electrification projects, substations amongst others. Subsidiary businesses include hospitality and education.

Jakson was founded in the year 1947 as an electrical goods trading company in Delhi, India. Jakson is one of the oldest Diesel generator manufacturing companies in India.
Jakson Group has been identified as amongst the Top 10 Energy Solutions Company in India. The company is also an Independent Power Producer (IPP) and have company owned solar power plants in many states in the Country.

The company diversified into solar, EPC and special application defense gensets businesses. Jakson has four manufacturing plants across India located in Kathua, Kalsar and Greater Noida. The Kathua and Kalsar plants are dedicated generator manufacturing facilities. The Greater Noida manufacturing plant is a solar module manufacturing facility that manufactures solar modules and solar products.
Jakson is committed to contribute to meet India’s renewable energy target of 450 GW by 2030. As a responsible company, Jakson is obligated to meet the Environmental, Social and Governance (ESG) objectives. Jakson CSR initiatives are aligned to Sustainable Development Goals (SDG’s) outlined by the United Nations & India with emphasis on Quality Education and Environment sustainability.

Jakson is an OEM of Cummins, an American Fortune 500 corporation in India.

Recent advancements 
Jakson Group announces its new venture Jakson Green Private Limited

Major power plants 
Jakson to set up 70mw solar power plant in Assam with an investment of INR 300 crores
10mw solar pv plant at Vishakhapatnam Port Aandhra Pradesh
Jakson Group to set up 50 Mw greenfield solar plant for Rs 300 cr in UP
Jakson commissions 27 MW solar power plant in Koppal, Karnataka for SolarArise
75 MW Solar PV Plant in Uttar Pradesh Commences Construction at Site as Notice to Proceed Is Issued

Jakson Group sets up 4 MW grid-linked solar PV plant

Notable projects
India's first solar-powered train for the Indian Railways
Roof-top solar power plant at President's Estate, Rashtrapati Bhawan
Rooftop solar PV system at DMRC metro station
Rooftop solar PV system at LBS Airport, Varanasi
Electrification of Kochi Metro Rail Network
450 KW rooftop solar PV plant at Anand Engineering College, Agra

References 

1947 establishments
Indian engineering organisations